SHSC may refer to:
Social Housing Services Corporation
Sunnybrook Health Sciences Centre
St Helena Secondary College